Beregovaya is a rural locality (a selo) in Kabansky District, Republic of Buryatia, Russia. The population was 346 as of 2010. There are 6 streets.

Geography 
Beregovaya is located 7 km southeast of Kabansk (the district's administrative centre) by road. Nyuki is the nearest rural locality.

References 

Rural localities in Kabansky District